The A505 is an east–west route in County Tyrone, in Northern Ireland. It starts in Omagh, the county town, from where it goes in the direction of Cookstown in the east of the county. The road passes Killyclogher, Mountfield, Creggan, Dunnamore, and Kildress.

The route traverses the southern are of the Sperrin Mountains. It serves much of the rural community of the locality, as well as An Creagán cultural centre, Dunnamore stone circles, Wellbrook Beetling Mill, and Drum Monor Forest Park.

References

Roads in County Tyrone